The social construction of the body is a hypothesis that affirms that the relationship between the body and the socio-cultural context occurs in both senses, and that society and culture influence the formation of its members to some extent. The body has become a social construction, in whose delimitation have participated multiple disciplines. Thus, medicine and religion can be mentioned as the agents that have traditionally influenced, together with the rules of urbanity and educational institutions. These four agents have been building a model, which every individual has as reference. According to Bryan S. Turner, the social construction of the body is: "The nearest and immediate feature of my social self, a necessary feature of my social situation and my personal identity, and at the same time an aspect of my personal alienation in the natural environment"

References

Sociological theories
Social constructionism